Frederik Fisker Nielsen (born 7 February 1998) is a Danish football player who plays as a centre-back.

Club career

Sheffield Wednesday
Fisker joined Sheffield Wednesday in September 2017.

In January 2018 he made his first team debut for the club, playing the whole game as Wednesday beat Carlisle United in the third round replay of the FA Cup.

Skive IK
On 25 September 2019 it was confirmed, that Fisker had returned to Denmark and signed a contract for the rest of 2019 with Skive IK. On 21 January 2019 he signed a new contract until the summer 2021. Fisker left Skive at the end of the 2021-22 season.

Career statistics

References

Danish men's footballers
Danish expatriate men's footballers
Denmark youth international footballers
1998 births
Living people
Sheffield Wednesday F.C. players
Skive IK players
Danish 1st Division players
English Football League players
Association football defenders
Danish expatriate sportspeople in England
Expatriate footballers in England